Lisa Marie Ness Klungland (born 7 January 1994) is a Norwegian politician.

She was elected representative to the Storting from the constituency of Rogaland for the period 2021–2025, for the Centre Party.

References

1994 births
Living people
Centre Party (Norway) politicians
Rogaland politicians
Members of the Storting
Women members of the Storting